Napster, commonly known as “Napster 2.0”, was a music streaming service and digital music store, launched by Roxio in 2003 under the purchased name and trademarks of former free peer-to-peer file sharing software Napster in the aftermath of the latter's 2002 bankruptcy and subsequent shut down after a series of legal actions taken by the RIAA. Roxio purchased Napster and a music streaming service called PressPlay in 2003, to create a new legal online music service that lets users access music through a subscription or on a fee-per-song basis. Napster was later acquired by Best Buy. The service was acquired by rival Rhapsody in 2011.

History

As a Roxio subsidiary
Roxio bought the assets of the original Napster company at its bankruptcy auction in 2002 and the online music service called pressplay in 2003, with the intention of using these assets as the basis of a new legal online music service which would let users access music through a subscription or on a fee-per-song basis. Roxio spent years revamping the company as a non-free online music service. This involved a great deal of management re-organization and the start of a new business model. Roxio spent years developing a network of business partners and relationships to ensure success for their new enterprise.

Napster MP3 player
 

Soon after launching the revamped Napster, Roxio partnered with Korean electronics maker Samsung to create a Napster-branded MP3 player. The player, named Samsung Napster YP-910 came with a 20GB hard disk that ran for ten hours on a lithium-polymer battery. It used a special version of Napster software and drivers to transfer DRM-protected files to the built-in hard disk.

Free Napster
In May 2006, Napster launched Free Napster. (via the URL http://free.napster.com/) It was a free, advertising-supported Web-based music player that enabled U.S. Napster users to stream full-length versions of all the songs in Napster's catalog of over 8 million tracks three times each, without downloading any software or making any service commitment. Visitors could also purchase DRM-free MP3 downloads. It was discontinued in March 2010.

As a Best Buy company
In 2008 Best Buy decided to enter the digital music market after introducing its Insignia line of MP3 players in the hopes of leveraging Napster's network to reach new consumers. Stiff competition with iTunes, Amazon MP3 and MySpace Music seriously threatened Napster's relevance and by 2008 the company was recording millions of dollars in losses for the second year in a row.
Napster was formerly headed by Chris Gorog who served as Chairman and CEO, Bradford D. Duea who served as President and Christopher Allen who served as Chief Operating Officer. On January 6, 2010, Gorog and Duea stepped down from their positions. In an interview, Gorog stated that "After we understood the approach Best Buy was taking with Napster, it became clear the company didn't need a CEO, a president and a COO going forward". Allen assumed the position of "General Manager," reporting to Chris Homeister, Best Buy's senior vice president of merchandising entertainment.

Purchase by Rhapsody

The company was acquired by Rhapsody, another streaming and download service, in 2011. On July 14, 2016, Rhapsody formally changed its name to Napster, joining the 33 countries where it already operated as Napster to form one global brand.

Services 
Napster, the basic subscription tier, offers unlimited listening for $5–7 per month (£10 per month in the UK). US members may also purchase DRM-free MP3 downloads at a discount. Napster also offers an MP3 store, a pay-per-track store which does not require a monthly subscription fee. 

Napster To Go, the company's portable subscription tier, allowed unlimited transfer of music for $8–10 per month (£8 per month in the UK). This service was discontinued after the takeover by Rhapsody. 

Napster's mobile music service Napster Mobile enables users to search and browse Napster’s music catalog and preview, purchase and play songs on their mobile handset through an integrated music player.

See also
Windows Media Player
Streaming media
DRM
Online music store
MusicStation
Comparison of media players

References

External links
Official website 

 

Best Buy
Music streaming services
Online music stores of the United States
Windows software
Internet properties established in 2003
Companies based in Los Angeles
Internet properties disestablished in 2011